State Road 441 (SR 441) is a  street in Port Orange, Daytona Beach Shores, and Daytona Beach. It is locally known as Peninsula Drive, and signed as a north–south road.

Route description
The southern terminus is an intersection with SR A1A near the Port Orange Causeway in Port Orange (SR A1A continues northeastward one block from the intersection before turning onto Dunlawton Avenue and running parallel with SR 441); the northern terminus is an intersection with US 92-SR 600 in Daytona Beach near the northeastern approach to the Broadway Bridge.

An alternative to SR A1A, State Road 441 serves the Halifax River side of the barrier island between the Intracoastal Waterway and the Atlantic Ocean.  In addition to the bridges near its termini, SR 441 also provides access (via Silver Beach Avenue, CR 4050) to Veterans Memorial Bridge in Daytona Beach.  A northwestern continuation of Peninsula Drive permits access to the nearby Main Street Bridge and (via Seabreeze Boulevard, SR 430) Seabreeze Bridge, both also in Daytona Beach.

Major intersections

References

External links

441
441